Among the Oak & Ash is an American folk rock band founded in 2008 by songwriter, composer, and producer Josh Joplin. The group was rounded out by vocalist and guitarist Garrison Starr, producer and bassist Brian Harrison, and drummer Bryan Owings. They have released two albums two date, Among the Oak & Ash (2009) and Devil Ship (2013), featuring a variety of guest musicians. Harrison died in 2014.

Releases

Among the Oak & Ash: 2009
The group released their debut, self-titled album in 2009. Their version of "Shady Grove" is featured in the Alan Wake video game series. The record was featured on Bob Harris's Sunday Country and Roots Music show on BBC Radio 2  as well as NPR's Mountain Stage, WNYC's SoundCheck, and Woodsongs.

Devil Ship: 2013
Produced by Joplin and Harrison, the band's sophomore record, Devil Ship, features musicians Paleface, Jessica Lea Mayfield, Lucy Wainwright Roche, Robby Turner, Front Country's touring bassist, Jeremy Darrow, Cari Norris, Bailey Cooke, Wes Langlois, David Mayfield, and members of Ghostfinger, Richie Kirkpatrick (guitar) and Ben Martin (drums). The album artwork was created by visual artist Julia Kuo, who also designed the cover for the band's debut.

References

American musical groups